Access Humboldt is a non-profit, community media organization formed in April 2006. It is a provider of Public-access television and FM Radio, operating from Humboldt County, California. It was initially formed to manage local cable franchise benefits on behalf of the County of Humboldt, California and the Cities of Eureka, Arcata, Fortuna, Rio Dell, Ferndale and Blue Lake. The community media center is based at the Eureka High School campus in Eureka, California. Access Humboldt seeks to deliver local voices via community media and is an active advocate in issues of community debate.

In 2016 the station received an operating license from the Federal Communications Commission for a community radio station KZZH-LP.

Public access TV
Access Humboldt's develops its own public access programming and is broadcast on the following channels:
 Educational programming, Suddenlink Communications - EDUC8 
 Live and pre-recorded local government up to national government programming, Suddenlink Communications - CIVIC10
 Locally focused and innovative story telling, Suddenlink Communications - AH11
 Local and non-local programming, Suddenlink Communications - AH12
 Civic programming, Wave Broadband channel 7 in Southern Humboldt County

It also provides an online archive for its users.

Advocacy
The station has been an active advocate for its community and audience, and has taken a position in a number of public debates, including:
net neutrality
concentration of media ownership.
capping of the lifeline budget and budget reductions in other services.
affordable access to high-speed internet

KZZH-LP 96.7FM
Access Humboldt includes its FCC-licensed and commercial-free FM radio broadcast. In addition to its FM radio broadcast, KZZH-LP provides its facility and equipment for community use in return for an annual subscription. Facilities include a studio equipped with green screen,  stage platforms, lighting, cameras, control room and editing suite.

External links
Access Humboldt
2016 Report

References

Mass media in Humboldt County, California
American public access television
Non-profit organizations based in the United States
Radio stations in California